O Realizador está Louco is Adelaide Ferreira's third album.

Track listing
 O realizador
 É por ti
 Alma vazia 
 A vida não é fácil
 Vou contigo
 Quem foi que te fez
 Doce Anjo
 Qual é a cor
 Oh mãe
 Angustia (instrumental).

1996 albums
Adelaide Ferreira albums